Sir Leslie Montagu Thomas (24 April 1906 – 27 November 1971) was a British Conservative politician.  He was elected Member of Parliament for Canterbury in a 1953 by-election, and served until he stood down in 1966. He had unsuccessfully contested Leek in 1935 as a National Labour candidate.

Thomas was the son of former Labour (turned National Labour) MP, Jimmy Thomas.

References

External links 
 

1906 births
1971 deaths
Conservative Party (UK) MPs for English constituencies
UK MPs 1951–1955
UK MPs 1955–1959
UK MPs 1959–1964
UK MPs 1964–1966
Politics of Canterbury
National Labour (UK) politicians
Knights Bachelor